The 1948 Kentucky Wildcats football team represented the University of Kentucky in the 1948 college football season. The Wildcats' were led by head coach Bear Bryant in his third season and finished the season with a record of five wins, three losses and one tie (5–3–2 overall, 1–3–1 in the SEC).

Schedule

References

Kentucky
Kentucky Wildcats football seasons
Kentucky Wildcats football